Dover High School can refer to:

Dover High School (Arkansas)
Dover High School (Delaware)
Dover High School (New Hampshire)
Dover High School (New Jersey)
Dover High School (Ohio)